Cody Walker (born 1967 in Baltimore, Maryland) is an American poet, essayist, and educator.

Family 
His brother Clay Walker is the Mayor of Denali Borough, Alaska.

Academic studies 
Walker holds a Bachelor of Arts from the University of Wisconsin, a Master of Fine Arts from the University of Arkansas, and a Ph.D. from the University of Washington.

Career 
A longtime writer-in-residence in Seattle Arts & Lectures' Writers in the Schools program, he was elected Seattle Poet Populist in 2007. He has been described as "Seattle's prince of the poetic one-two punch". In 2009, he spent a term as the Amy Clampitt Resident Fellow  in Lenox, Massachusetts.

His work appears in The Cortland Review, The Best American Poetry, Slate, Parnassus, Light, and The Yale Review. He currently teaches English at the University of Michigan, and writes regularly for The Kenyon Review.

Awards
He is a co-recipient of the 2009 Amy Clampitt Residency Award and author of the poetry collection Shuffle and Breakdown. Walker received the James Boatwright III Prize for Poetry  from Shenandoah in 2003 and a Distinguished Teaching Award from the University of Washington in 2005. In 2010, he won Cartoon Caption Contest #226 in The New Yorker.

Works
"Poetry"; "Warmer Still"; "Cinque Poesie", Courtland Review, February 2003, Issue 22
"St. Louis / January 1891"; "Wheeling / February 1892" , Courtland Review, November 2007, Issue 37
"Petronius"; “The Mould of a Dog Corpse”, Mare Nostrum, Volume III
 Shuffle and Breakdown, was published in 2008 by The Waywiser Press.

Notes

External links 
 Cody Walker official website
 Interview in the Seattle Weekly
 Interview on KUOW Radio
 Review of Shuffle and Breakdown in the Ann Arbor Observer
 Video of "The Comic Imagination" panel at the Philoctetes Center, moderated by Cody Walker and featuring Lewis Black, Jim Holt, Bruce McCall, and Tami Sagher
 Captions in the Classroom, The New Yorker, June 7, 2013

Living people
Poets from Maryland
1967 births
University of Wisconsin–Madison alumni
University of Arkansas alumni
University of Washington alumni
University of Michigan faculty
Writers from Baltimore
21st-century American poets